Legionella moravica is a Gram-negative bacterium from the genus Legionella which was isolated from cooling-tower water samples in Czechoslovakia.

References

External links
Type strain of Legionella moravica at BacDive -  the Bacterial Diversity Metadatabase

Legionellales
Bacteria described in 1989